Ballstown is an unincorporated community in Laughery Township, Ripley County, in the U.S. state of Indiana.

History
Ballstown was platted in 1848 by Samuel Ball, and named for him. A post office was established at Ballstown in 1844, and remained in operation until 1904.

Geography

References

Unincorporated communities in Ripley County, Indiana
Unincorporated communities in Indiana